Corybas diemenicus, commonly known as the stately helmet orchid or veined helmet orchid, is a species of terrestrial orchid endemic to south-eastern Australia. It has round or heart-shaped leaf and a reddish purple flower with a central white patch.

Description 
The leaf is green on the upper surface and silvery green on the lower side. The petals are wider than but shorter than the lateral sepals and joined to them. Flowering occurs from June to December.

Taxonomy 
The stately helmet orchid was first formally described in 1840 by John Lindley and given the name Corysanthes diemenica. The description was published in Lindley's book The Genera and Species of Orchidaceous Plants. In 1942 Herman Rupp and William Nicholls changed the name to Corybas diemenicus. The specific epithet (diemenicus) is a Latin word meaning "belonging to, or from Tasmania". (Tasmania was formerly known as Van Diemen's Land.)

Distribution and habitat
Corybas diemenicus is widespread and common, growing in moist forest and rainforest, sometimes in drier habitats. It occurs in New South Wales south from Barrington Tops National Park through the Australian Capital Territory to the south-east of Victoria and Tasmania.

References 

diemenicus
Endemic orchids of Australia
Orchids of New South Wales
Orchids of the Australian Capital Territory
Orchids of Victoria (Australia)
Orchids of Tasmania
Plants described in 1840